The House at 114 Marble Street in Stoneham, Massachusetts is a well-preserved Gothic Victorian cottage, built c. 1850.  It is a -story wood-frame house with a rear ell, sheathed in wooden clapboards.  It has a front gable centered over the main entry, which features turned posts and balusters, and a Stick-style valance.  Windows in the gable ends have pointed arches characteristic of the style.  The front gable is decorated with vergeboard.

The house was listed on the National Register of Historic Places in 1984.

See also
National Register of Historic Places listings in Stoneham, Massachusetts
National Register of Historic Places listings in Middlesex County, Massachusetts

References

Houses on the National Register of Historic Places in Stoneham, Massachusetts
Gothic Revival architecture in Massachusetts
Houses completed in 1850
Houses in Stoneham, Massachusetts